Arjan Christianen (born 19 December 1982 in Oud Gastel) is a Dutch retired professional footballer who played as a goalkeeper.

Club career
He played professionally for Willem II in the Dutch Eredivisie as well as for NAC, Fortuna Sittard and RBC. His final match as a professional was his only Eredivisie match ever.

He finished his career at amateur side Halsteren.

References

External links
 Voetbal International

1982 births
Living people
People from Halderberge
Association football goalkeepers
Dutch footballers
NAC Breda players
Fortuna Sittard players
RBC Roosendaal players
Willem II (football club) players
Eredivisie players
Eerste Divisie players
Footballers from North Brabant